X-ray crystallography is the experimental science determining the atomic and molecular structure of a crystal, in which the crystalline structure causes a beam of incident X-rays to diffract into many specific directions. By measuring the angles and intensities of these diffracted beams, a crystallographer can produce a three-dimensional picture of the density of electrons within the crystal. From this electron density, the mean positions of the atoms in the crystal can be determined, as well as their chemical bonds, their crystallographic disorder, and various other information.

Since many materials can form crystals—such as salts, metals, minerals, semiconductors, as well as various inorganic, organic, and biological molecules—X-ray crystallography has been fundamental in the development of many scientific fields. In its first decades of use, this method determined the size of atoms, the lengths and types of chemical bonds, and the atomic-scale differences among various materials, especially minerals and alloys. The method also revealed the structure and function of many biological molecules, including vitamins, drugs, proteins and nucleic acids such as DNA. X-ray crystallography is still the primary method for characterizing the atomic structure of new materials and in discerning materials that appear similar by other experiments. X-ray crystal structures can also account for unusual electronic or elastic properties of a material, shed light on chemical interactions and processes, or serve as the basis for designing pharmaceuticals against diseases.

In a single-crystal X-ray diffraction measurement, a crystal is mounted on a goniometer.  The goniometer is used to position the crystal at selected orientations.  The crystal is illuminated with a finely focused monochromatic beam of X-rays, producing a diffraction pattern of regularly spaced spots known as reflections. The two-dimensional images taken at different orientations are converted into a three-dimensional model of the density of electrons within the crystal using the mathematical method of Fourier transforms, combined with chemical data known for the sample. Poor resolution (fuzziness) or even errors may result if the crystals are too small, or not uniform enough in their internal makeup.

X-ray crystallography is related to several other methods for determining atomic structures. Similar diffraction patterns can be produced by scattering electrons or neutrons, and neutron scattering can be similarly interpreted by Fourier transformation. If single crystals of sufficient size cannot be obtained, various other X-ray methods can be applied to obtain less detailed information; such methods include fiber diffraction, powder diffraction and (if the sample is not crystallized) small-angle X-ray scattering (SAXS).
If the material under investigation is only available in the form of nanocrystalline powders or suffers from poor crystallinity, the methods of electron diffraction, transmission electron microscopy and electron crystallography can be applied for determining the atomic structure.

For all above mentioned X-ray diffraction methods, the scattering is elastic; the scattered X-rays have the same wavelength as the incoming X-ray. By contrast, inelastic X-ray scattering methods are useful in studying excitations of the sample such as plasmons, crystal-field and orbital excitations, magnons, and phonons, rather than the distribution of its atoms.

History

Early scientific history of crystals and X-rays

Crystals, though long admired for their regularity and symmetry, were not investigated scientifically until the 17th century. Johannes Kepler hypothesized in his work Strena seu de Nive Sexangula (A New Year's Gift of Hexagonal Snow) (1611) that the hexagonal symmetry of snowflake crystals was due to a regular packing of spherical water particles. The Danish scientist Nicolas Steno (1669) pioneered experimental investigations of crystal symmetry. Steno showed that the angles between the faces are the same in every exemplar of a particular type of crystal. René Just Haüy (1784) discovered that every face of a crystal can be described by simple stacking patterns of blocks of the same shape and size. Hence, William Hallowes Miller in 1839 was able to give each face a unique label of three small integers, the Miller indices which remain in use for identifying crystal faces. Haüy's study led to the idea that crystals are a regular three-dimensional array (a Bravais lattice) of atoms and molecules; a single unit cell is repeated indefinitely along three principal directions. In the 19th century, a complete catalog of the possible symmetries of a crystal was worked out by Johan Hessel, Auguste Bravais, Evgraf Fedorov, Arthur Schönflies and (belatedly) William Barlow (1894). Barlow proposed several crystal structures in the 1880s that were validated later by X-ray crystallography; however, the available data were too scarce in the 1880s to accept his models as conclusive.

Wilhelm Röntgen discovered X-rays in 1895. Physicists were uncertain of the nature of X-rays, but soon suspected that they were waves of electromagnetic radiation. The Maxwell theory of electromagnetic radiation was well accepted, and experiments by Charles Glover Barkla showed that X-rays exhibited phenomena associated with electromagnetic waves, including transverse polarization and spectral lines akin to those observed in the visible wavelengths. Barkla created the x-ray notation, as well, noting in 1909 two separate types of diffraction beams, at first, naming them "A" and "B" and then supposing that there may be lines prior to "A", he started an alphabet numbering beginning with "K." Single-slit experiments in the laboratory of Arnold Sommerfeld suggested that X-rays had a wavelength of about 1 angstrom. X-rays are not only waves but are also photons, and have particle properties causing Sommerfeld to coin the name, Bremsstrahlung, for this wavelike type of diffraction. Albert Einstein introduced the photon concept in 1905, but it was not broadly accepted until 1922, when Arthur Compton confirmed it by the scattering of X-rays from electrons. The particle-like properties of X-rays, such as their ionization of gases, had prompted William Henry Bragg to argue in 1907 that X-rays were not electromagnetic radiation.  Bragg's view proved unpopular and the observation of X-ray diffraction by Max von Laue in 1912 confirmed for most scientists that X-rays are a form of electromagnetic radiation.

X-ray diffraction 

Crystals are regular arrays of atoms, and X-rays can be considered waves of electromagnetic radiation. Atoms scatter X-ray waves, primarily through the atoms' electrons. Just as an ocean wave striking a lighthouse produces secondary circular waves emanating from the lighthouse, so an X-ray striking an electron produces secondary spherical waves emanating from the electron. This phenomenon is known as elastic scattering, and the electron (or lighthouse) is known as the scatterer. A regular array of scatterers produces a regular array of spherical waves. Although these waves cancel one another out in most directions through destructive interference, they add constructively in a few specific directions, determined by Bragg's law:

Here d is the spacing between diffracting planes,  is the incident angle, n is any integer, and λ is the wavelength of the beam. These specific directions appear as spots on the diffraction pattern called reflections. Thus, X-ray diffraction results from an electromagnetic wave (the X-ray) impinging on a regular array of scatterers (the repeating arrangement of atoms within the crystal).

X-rays are used to produce the diffraction pattern because their wavelength λ is typically the same order of magnitude (1–100 angstroms) as the spacing d between planes in the crystal. In principle, any wave impinging on a regular array of scatterers produces diffraction, as predicted first by Francesco Maria Grimaldi in 1665. To produce significant diffraction, the spacing between the scatterers and the wavelength of the impinging wave should be similar in size. For illustration, the diffraction of sunlight through a bird's feather was first reported by James Gregory in the later 17th century. The first artificial diffraction gratings for visible light were constructed by David Rittenhouse in 1787, and Joseph von Fraunhofer in 1821. However, visible light has too long a wavelength (typically, 5500 angstroms) to observe diffraction from crystals. Prior to the first X-ray diffraction experiments, the spacings between lattice planes in a crystal were not known with certainty.

The idea that crystals could be used as a diffraction grating for X-rays arose in 1912 in a conversation between Paul Peter Ewald and Max von Laue in the English Garden in Munich. Ewald had proposed a resonator model of crystals for his thesis, but this model could not be validated using visible light, since the wavelength was much larger than the spacing between the resonators. Von Laue realized that electromagnetic radiation of a shorter wavelength was needed to observe such small spacings, and suggested that X-rays might have a wavelength comparable to the unit-cell spacing in crystals. Von Laue worked with two technicians, Walter Friedrich and his assistant Paul Knipping, to shine a beam of X-rays through a copper sulfate crystal and record its diffraction on a photographic plate. After being developed, the plate showed a large number of well-defined spots arranged in a pattern of intersecting circles around the spot produced by the central beam. Von Laue developed a law that connects the scattering angles and the size and orientation of the unit-cell spacings in the crystal, for which he was awarded the Nobel Prize in Physics in 1914.

Scattering

As described in the mathematical derivation below, the X-ray scattering is determined by the density of electrons within the crystal. Since the energy of an X-ray is much greater than that of a valence electron, the scattering may be modeled as Thomson scattering, the interaction of an electromagnetic ray with a free electron. This model is generally adopted to describe the polarization of the scattered radiation.

The intensity of Thomson scattering for one particle with mass m and elementary charge q is:
 

Hence the atomic nuclei, which are much heavier than an electron, contribute negligibly to the scattered X-rays.  Consequently, the coherent scattering detected from an atom can be accurately approximated by analyzing the collective scattering from the electrons in the system.

Development from 1912 to 1920

After Von Laue's pioneering research, the field developed rapidly, most notably by physicists William Lawrence Bragg and his father William Henry Bragg. In 1912–1913, the younger Bragg developed Bragg's law, which connects the observed scattering with reflections from evenly spaced planes within the crystal. The Braggs, father and son, shared the 1915 Nobel Prize in Physics for their work in crystallography. The earliest structures were generally simple and marked by one-dimensional symmetry. However, as computational and experimental methods improved over the next decades, it became feasible to deduce reliable atomic positions for more complicated two- and three-dimensional arrangements of atoms in the unit-cell.

The potential of X-ray crystallography for determining the structure of molecules and minerals—then only known vaguely from chemical and hydrodynamic experiments—was realized immediately. The earliest structures were simple inorganic crystals and minerals, but even these revealed fundamental laws of physics and chemistry. The first atomic-resolution structure to be "solved" (i.e., determined) in 1914 was that of table salt. The distribution of electrons in the table-salt structure showed that crystals are not necessarily composed of covalently bonded molecules, and proved the existence of ionic compounds. The structure of diamond was solved in the same year, proving the tetrahedral arrangement of its chemical bonds and showing that the length of C–C single bond was 1.52 angstroms. Other early structures included copper, calcium fluoride (CaF2, also known as fluorite), calcite (CaCO3) and pyrite (FeS2) in 1914; spinel (MgAl2O4) in 1915; the rutile and anatase forms of titanium dioxide (TiO2) in 1916; pyrochroite Mn(OH)2 and, by extension, brucite Mg(OH)2 in 1919. Also in 1919, sodium nitrate (NaNO3) and caesium dichloroiodide (CsICl2) were determined by Ralph Walter Graystone Wyckoff, and the wurtzite (hexagonal ZnS) structure became known in 1920.

The structure of graphite was solved in 1916 by the related method of powder diffraction, which was developed by Peter Debye and Paul Scherrer and, independently, by Albert Hull in 1917. The structure of graphite was determined from single-crystal diffraction in 1924 by two groups independently. Hull also used the powder method to determine the structures of various metals, such as iron and magnesium.

Cultural and aesthetic importance
In 1951, the Festival Pattern Group at the Festival of Britain hosted a collaborative group of textile manufacturers and experienced crystallographers to design lace and prints based on the X-ray crystallography of insulin, china clay, and hemoglobin. One of the leading scientists of the project was Helen Megaw, the Assistant Director of Research at the Cavendish Laboratory in Cambridge at the time. Megaw is credited as one of the central figures who took inspiration from crystal diagrams and saw their potential in design. In 2008, the Wellcome Collection in London curated an exhibition on the Festival Pattern Group called "From Atom to Patterns".

Contributions to chemistry and material science
X-ray crystallography has led to a better understanding of chemical bonds and non-covalent interactions. The initial studies revealed the typical radii of atoms, and confirmed many theoretical models of chemical bonding, such as the tetrahedral bonding of carbon in the diamond structure, the octahedral bonding of metals observed in ammonium hexachloroplatinate (IV), and the resonance observed in the planar carbonate group and in aromatic molecules. Kathleen Lonsdale's 1928 structure of hexamethylbenzene established the hexagonal symmetry of benzene and showed a clear difference in bond length between the aliphatic C–C bonds and aromatic C–C bonds; this finding led to the idea of resonance between chemical bonds, which had profound consequences for the development of chemistry. Her conclusions were anticipated by William Henry Bragg, who published models of naphthalene and anthracene in 1921 based on other molecules, an early form of molecular replacement.

Also in the 1920s, Victor Moritz Goldschmidt and later Linus Pauling developed rules for eliminating chemically unlikely structures and for determining the relative sizes of atoms. These rules led to the structure of brookite (1928) and an understanding of the relative stability of the rutile, brookite and anatase forms of titanium dioxide.

The distance between two bonded atoms is a sensitive measure of the bond strength and its bond order; thus, X-ray crystallographic studies have led to the discovery of even more exotic types of bonding in inorganic chemistry, such as metal-metal double bonds, metal-metal quadruple bonds, and three-center, two-electron bonds. X-ray crystallography—or, strictly speaking, an inelastic Compton scattering experiment—has also provided evidence for the partly covalent character of hydrogen bonds. In the field of organometallic chemistry, the X-ray structure of ferrocene initiated scientific studies of sandwich compounds, while that of Zeise's salt stimulated research into "back bonding" and metal-pi complexes. Finally, X-ray crystallography had a pioneering role in the development of supramolecular chemistry, particularly in clarifying the structures of the crown ethers and the principles of host–guest chemistry.

X-ray diffraction is a very powerful tool in catalyst development. Ex-situ measurements are carried out routinely for checking the crystal structure of materials or to unravel new structures. In-situ experiments give comprehensive understanding about the structural stability of catalysts under reaction conditions.

In material sciences, many complicated inorganic and organometallic systems have been analyzed using single-crystal methods, such as fullerenes, metalloporphyrins, and other complicated compounds. Single-crystal diffraction is also used in the pharmaceutical industry, due to recent problems with polymorphs. The major factors affecting the quality of single-crystal structures are the crystal's size and regularity; recrystallization is a commonly used technique to improve these factors in small-molecule crystals. The Cambridge Structural Database contains over 1,000,000 structures as of June 2019; over 99% of these structures were determined by X-ray diffraction.

Mineralogy and metallurgy

Since the 1920s, X-ray diffraction has been the principal method for determining the arrangement of atoms in minerals and metals. The application of X-ray crystallography to mineralogy began with the structure of garnet, which was determined in 1924 by Menzer. A systematic X-ray crystallographic study of the silicates was undertaken in the 1920s. This study showed that, as the Si/O ratio is altered, the silicate crystals exhibit significant changes in their atomic arrangements. Machatschki extended these insights to minerals in which aluminium substitutes for the silicon atoms of the silicates. The first application of X-ray crystallography to metallurgy likewise occurred in the mid-1920s. Most notably, Linus Pauling's structure of the alloy Mg2Sn led to his theory of the stability and structure of complex ionic crystals.

On October 17, 2012, the Curiosity rover on the planet Mars at "Rocknest" performed the first X-ray diffraction analysis of Martian soil. The results from the rover's CheMin analyzer revealed the presence of several minerals, including feldspar, pyroxenes and olivine, and suggested that the Martian soil in the sample was similar to the "weathered basaltic soils" of Hawaiian volcanoes.

Early organic and small biological molecules

The first structure of an organic compound, hexamethylenetetramine, was solved in 1923. This was followed by several studies of long-chain fatty acids, which are an important component of biological membranes. In the 1930s, the structures of much larger molecules with two-dimensional complexity began to be solved. A significant advance was the structure of phthalocyanine, a large planar molecule that is closely related to porphyrin molecules important in biology, such as heme, corrin and chlorophyll.

X-ray crystallography of biological molecules took off with Dorothy Crowfoot Hodgkin, who solved the structures of cholesterol (1937), penicillin (1946) and vitamin B12 (1956), for which she was awarded the Nobel Prize in Chemistry in 1964. In 1969, she succeeded in solving the structure of insulin, on which she worked for over thirty years.

Biological macromolecular crystallography

Crystal structures of proteins (which are irregular and hundreds of times larger than cholesterol) began to be solved in the late 1950s, beginning with the structure of sperm whale myoglobin by Sir John Cowdery Kendrew, for which he shared the Nobel Prize in Chemistry with Max Perutz in 1962. Since that success, over 130,000 X-ray crystal structures of proteins, nucleic acids and other biological molecules have been determined. The nearest competing method in number of structures analyzed is nuclear magnetic resonance (NMR) spectroscopy, which has resolved less than one tenth as many. Crystallography can solve structures of arbitrarily large molecules, whereas solution-state NMR is restricted to relatively small ones (less than 70 kDa). X-ray crystallography is used routinely to determine how a pharmaceutical drug interacts with its protein target and what changes might improve it. However, intrinsic membrane proteins remain challenging to crystallize because they require detergents or other denaturants to solubilize them in isolation, and such detergents often interfere with crystallization. Membrane proteins are a large component of the genome, and include many proteins of great physiological importance, such as ion channels and receptors. Helium cryogenics are used to prevent radiation damage in protein crystals.

On the other end of the size scale, even relatively small molecules may pose challenges for the resolving power of X-ray crystallography. The structure assigned in 1991 to the antibiotic isolated from a marine organism, diazonamide A (C40H34Cl2N6O6, molar mass 765.65 g/mol), proved to be incorrect by the classical proof of structure: a synthetic sample was not identical to the natural product.  The mistake was attributed to the inability of X-ray crystallography to distinguish between the correct -OH / -NH and the interchanged -NH2 / -O- groups in the incorrect structure. With advances in instrumentation, however, similar groups can be distinguished using modern single-crystal X-ray diffractometers.

Despite being an invaluable tool in structural biology, protein crystallography carries some inherent problems in its methodology that hinder data interpretation. The crystal lattice, which is formed during the crystallization process, contains numerous units of the purified protein, which are densely and symmetrically packed in the crystal. When looking for a previously unknown protein, figuring out its shape and boundaries within the crystal lattice can be challenging. Proteins are usually composed of smaller subunits, and the task of distinguishing between the subunits and identifying the actual protein, can be challenging even for the experienced crystallographers. The non-biological interfaces that occur during crystallization are known as crystal-packing contacts (or simply, crystal contacts) and cannot be distinguished by crystallographic means. When a new protein structure is solved by X-ray crystallography and deposited in the Protein Data Bank, its authors are requested to specify the "biological assembly" which would constitute the functional, biologically-relevant protein. However, errors, missing data and inaccurate annotations during the submission of the data, give rise to obscure structures and compromise the reliability of the database. The error rate in the case of faulty annotations alone has been reported to be upwards of 6.6% or approximately 15%, arguably a non-trivial size considering the number of deposited structures. This "interface classification problem" is typically tackled by computational approaches and has become a recognized subject in structural bioinformatics.

Scattering techniques

Elastic vs. inelastic scattering
X-ray crystallography is a form of elastic scattering; the outgoing X-rays have the same energy, and thus same wavelength, as the incoming X-rays, only with altered direction. By contrast, inelastic scattering occurs when energy is transferred from the incoming X-ray to the crystal, e.g., by exciting an inner-shell electron to a higher energy level. Such inelastic scattering reduces the energy (or increases the wavelength) of the outgoing beam. Inelastic scattering is useful for probing such excitations of matter, but not in determining the distribution of scatterers within the matter, which is the goal of X-ray crystallography.

X-rays range in wavelength from 10 to 0.01 nanometers; a typical wavelength used for crystallography is 1 Å (0.1 nm), which is on the scale of covalent chemical bonds and the radius of a single atom. Longer-wavelength photons (such as ultraviolet radiation) would not have sufficient resolution to determine the atomic positions. At the other extreme, shorter-wavelength photons such as gamma rays are difficult to produce in large numbers, difficult to focus, and interact too strongly with matter, producing particle-antiparticle pairs. Therefore, X-rays are the "sweetspot" for wavelength when determining atomic-resolution structures from the scattering of electromagnetic radiation.

Other X-ray techniques
Other forms of elastic X-ray scattering besides single-crystal diffraction include powder diffraction, Small-Angle X-ray Scattering (SAXS) and several types of X-ray fiber diffraction, which was used by Rosalind Franklin in determining the double-helix structure of DNA. In general, single-crystal X-ray diffraction offers more structural information than these other techniques; however, it requires a sufficiently large and regular crystal, which is not always available.

These scattering methods generally use monochromatic X-rays, which are restricted to a single wavelength with minor deviations. A broad spectrum of X-rays (that is, a blend of X-rays with different wavelengths) can also be used to carry out X-ray diffraction, a technique known as the Laue method. This is the method used in the original discovery of X-ray diffraction. Laue scattering provides much structural information with only a short exposure to the X-ray beam, and is therefore used in structural studies of very rapid events (Time resolved crystallography). However, it is not as well-suited as monochromatic scattering for determining the full atomic structure of a crystal and therefore works better with crystals with relatively simple atomic arrangements.

The Laue back reflection mode records X-rays scattered backwards from a broad spectrum source. This is useful if the sample is too thick for X-rays to transmit through it. The diffracting planes in the crystal are determined by knowing that the normal to the diffracting plane bisects the angle between the incident beam and the diffracted beam. A Greninger chart can be used to interpret the back reflection Laue photograph.

Electron and neutron diffraction
Other particles, such as electrons and neutrons, may be used to produce a diffraction pattern. Although electron, neutron, and X-ray scattering are based on different physical processes, the resulting diffraction patterns are analyzed using the same diffraction techniques.

As derived below, the electron density within the crystal and diffraction patterns are often related by a simple mathematical method, the Fourier transform, which allows the density to be calculated relatively easily from the patterns. However, this works only if the scattering is weak, i.e., if the scattered beams are much less intense than the incoming beam. Weakly scattered X-ray or neutron beams pass through the remainder of the crystal without undergoing a second scattering event. Such re-scattered waves are called "secondary scattering" or "dynamical diffraction" and change the analysis. Any sufficiently thick crystal will produce dynamical diffraction, but since X-rays and neutrons interact relatively weakly with matter, this is generally not a significant concern when they are used. 

Because they interact via the Coulomb forces the scattering of electrons by matter is 1000 or more times stronger than for X-rays. Hence electron beams produce strong dynamical scattering even for relatively thin crystals (>10 nm). While there are similarities between the diffraction of x-rays and electrons, as can be found in the book by John M. Cowley, the approach is typically different as it is based upon the original approach of Hans Bethe and solving Schrödinger equation for relativistic electrons, rather than a kinematical or Bragg's law approach. Information about very small regions, down to single atoms is possible. The range of applications for electron diffraction, transmission electron microscopy and transmission electron crystallography with high energy electrons is extensive; see the relevant links for more information and citations. In addition to transmission methods, low-energy electron diffraction is a technique where electrons are back-scattered of surfaces and has been extensively used to determine surface structures at the atomic scale, and reflection high-energy electron diffraction is another which is extensively used to monitor thin film growth.

Neutron diffraction is an excellent method for structure determination, although it has been difficult to obtain intense, monochromatic beams of neutrons in sufficient quantities. Traditionally, nuclear reactors have been used, although sources producing neutrons by spallation are becoming increasingly available. Being uncharged, neutrons scatter much more readily from the atomic nuclei rather than from the electrons. Therefore, neutron scattering is very useful for observing the positions of light atoms with few electrons, especially hydrogen, which is essentially invisible in the X-ray diffraction. Neutron scattering also has the remarkable property that the solvent can be made invisible by adjusting the ratio of normal water, H2O, and heavy water, D2O.

Methods

Overview of single-crystal X-ray diffraction

The oldest and most precise method of X-ray crystallography is single-crystal X-ray diffraction, in which a beam of X-rays strikes a single crystal, producing scattered beams. When they land on a piece of film or other detector, these beams make a diffraction pattern of spots; the strengths and angles of these beams are recorded as the crystal is gradually rotated. Each spot is called a reflection, since it corresponds to the reflection of the X-rays from one set of evenly spaced planes within the crystal. For single crystals of sufficient purity and regularity, X-ray diffraction data can determine the mean chemical bond lengths and angles to within a few thousandths of an angstrom and to within a few tenths of a degree, respectively. The atoms in a crystal are not static, but oscillate about their mean positions, usually by less than a few tenths of an angstrom. X-ray crystallography allows measuring the size of these oscillations.

Procedure
The technique of single-crystal X-ray crystallography has three basic steps. The first—and often most difficult—step is to obtain an adequate crystal of the material under study. The crystal should be sufficiently large (typically larger than 0.1 mm in all dimensions), pure in composition and regular in structure, with no significant internal imperfections such as cracks or twinning.

In the second step, the crystal is placed in an intense beam of X-rays, usually of a single wavelength (monochromatic X-rays), producing the regular pattern of reflections. The angles and intensities of diffracted X-rays are measured, with each compound having a unique diffraction pattern. As the crystal is gradually rotated, previous reflections disappear and new ones appear; the intensity of every spot is recorded at every orientation of the crystal. Multiple data sets may have to be collected, with each set covering slightly more than half a full rotation of the crystal and typically containing tens of thousands of reflections.

In the third step, these data are combined computationally with complementary chemical information to produce and refine a model of the arrangement of atoms within the crystal. The final, refined model of the atomic arrangement—now called a crystal structure—is usually stored in a public database.

Limitations

As the crystal's repeating unit, its unit cell, becomes larger and more complex, the atomic-level picture provided by X-ray crystallography becomes less well-resolved (more "fuzzy") for a given number of observed reflections. Two limiting cases of X-ray crystallography—"small-molecule" (which includes continuous inorganic solids) and "macromolecular" crystallography—are often discerned. Small-molecule crystallography typically involves crystals with fewer than 100 atoms in their asymmetric unit; such crystal structures are usually so well resolved that the atoms can be discerned as isolated "blobs" of electron density. By contrast, macromolecular crystallography often involves tens of thousands of atoms in the unit cell. Such crystal structures are generally less well-resolved (more "smeared out"); the atoms and chemical bonds appear as tubes of electron density, rather than as isolated atoms. In general, small molecules are also easier to crystallize than macromolecules; however, X-ray crystallography has proven possible even for viruses and proteins with hundreds of thousands of atoms, through improved crystallographic imaging and technology. Though normally X-ray crystallography can only be performed if the sample is in crystal form, new research has been done into sampling non-crystalline forms of samples.

Crystallization

Although crystallography can be used to characterize the disorder in an impure or irregular crystal, crystallography generally requires a pure crystal of high regularity to solve the structure of a complicated arrangement of atoms. Pure, regular crystals can sometimes be obtained from natural or synthetic materials, such as samples of metals, minerals or other macroscopic materials. The regularity of such crystals can sometimes be improved with macromolecular crystal annealing and other methods. However, in many cases, obtaining a diffraction-quality crystal is the chief barrier to solving its atomic-resolution structure.

Small-molecule and macromolecular crystallography differ in the range of possible techniques used to produce diffraction-quality crystals. Small molecules generally have few degrees of conformational freedom, and may be crystallized by a wide range of methods, such as chemical vapor deposition and recrystallization. By contrast, macromolecules generally have many degrees of freedom and their crystallization must be carried out so as to maintain a stable structure. For example, proteins and larger RNA molecules cannot be crystallized if their tertiary structure has been unfolded; therefore, the range of crystallization conditions is restricted to solution conditions in which such molecules remain folded.

 Protein crystals are almost always grown in solution. The most common approach is to lower the solubility of its component molecules very gradually; if this is done too quickly, the molecules will precipitate from solution, forming a useless dust or amorphous gel on the bottom of the container. Crystal growth in solution is characterized by two steps: nucleation of a microscopic crystallite (possibly having only 100 molecules), followed by growth of that crystallite, ideally to a diffraction-quality crystal. The solution conditions that favor the first step (nucleation) are not always the same conditions that favor the second step (subsequent growth). The crystallographer's goal is to identify solution conditions that favor the development of a single, large crystal, since larger crystals offer improved resolution of the molecule. Consequently, the solution conditions should disfavor the first step (nucleation) but favor the second (growth), so that only one large crystal forms per droplet. If nucleation is favored too much, a shower of small crystallites will form in the droplet, rather than one large crystal; if favored too little, no crystal will form whatsoever. Other approaches involves, crystallizing proteins under oil, where aqueous protein solutions are dispensed under liquid oil, and water evaporates through the layer of oil. Different oils have different evaporation permeabilities, therefore yielding changes in concentration rates from different percipient/protein mixture.

It is extremely difficult to predict good conditions for nucleation or growth of well-ordered crystals. In practice, favorable conditions are identified by screening; a very large batch of the molecules is prepared, and a wide variety of crystallization solutions are tested. Hundreds, even thousands, of solution conditions are generally tried before finding the successful one. The various conditions can use one or more physical mechanisms to lower the solubility of the molecule; for example, some may change the pH, some contain salts of the Hofmeister series or chemicals that lower the dielectric constant of the solution, and still others contain large polymers such as polyethylene glycol that drive the molecule out of solution by entropic effects. It is also common to try several temperatures for encouraging crystallization, or to gradually lower the temperature so that the solution becomes supersaturated. These methods require large amounts of the target molecule, as they use high concentration of the molecule(s) to be crystallized. Due to the difficulty in obtaining such large quantities (milligrams) of crystallization-grade protein, robots have been developed that are capable of accurately dispensing crystallization trial drops that are in the order of 100 nanoliters in volume. This means that 10-fold less protein is used per experiment when compared to crystallization trials set up by hand (in the order of 1 microliter).

Several factors are known to inhibit or mar crystallization. The growing crystals are generally held at a constant temperature and protected from shocks or vibrations that might disturb their crystallization. Impurities in the molecules or in the crystallization solutions are often inimical to crystallization. Conformational flexibility in the molecule also tends to make crystallization less likely, due to entropy. Molecules that tend to self-assemble into regular helices are often unwilling to assemble into crystals. Crystals can be marred by twinning, which can occur when a unit cell can pack equally favorably in multiple orientations; although recent advances in computational methods may allow solving the structure of some twinned crystals. Having failed to crystallize a target molecule, a crystallographer may try again with a slightly modified version of the molecule; even small changes in molecular properties can lead to large differences in crystallization behavior.

Data collection

Mounting the crystal

The crystal is mounted for measurements so that it may be held in the X-ray beam and rotated. There are several methods of mounting. In the past, crystals were loaded into glass capillaries with the crystallization solution (the mother liquor).  Nowadays, crystals of small molecules are typically attached with oil or glue to a glass fiber or a loop, which is made of nylon or plastic and attached to a solid rod.  Protein crystals are scooped up by a loop, then flash-frozen with liquid nitrogen. This freezing reduces the radiation damage of the X-rays, as well as the noise in the Bragg peaks due to thermal motion (the Debye-Waller effect). However, untreated protein crystals often crack if flash-frozen; therefore, they are generally pre-soaked in a cryoprotectant solution before freezing. Unfortunately, this pre-soak may itself cause the crystal to crack, ruining it for crystallography. Generally, successful cryo-conditions are identified by trial and error.

The capillary or loop is mounted on a goniometer, which allows it to be positioned accurately within the X-ray beam and rotated. Since both the crystal and the beam are often very small, the crystal must be centered within the beam to within ~25 micrometers accuracy, which is aided by a camera focused on the crystal. The most common type of goniometer is the "kappa goniometer", which offers three angles of rotation: the ω angle, which rotates about an axis perpendicular to the beam; the κ angle, about an axis at ~50° to the ω axis; and, finally, the φ angle about the loop/capillary axis. When the κ angle is zero, the ω and φ axes are aligned. The κ rotation allows for convenient mounting of the crystal, since the arm in which the crystal is mounted may be swung out towards the crystallographer. The oscillations carried out during data collection (mentioned below) involve the ω axis only. An older type of goniometer is the four-circle goniometer, and its relatives such as the six-circle goniometer.

X-ray sources

Rotating anode
Small scale crystallography can be done with a local X-ray tube source, typically coupled with an image plate detector. These have the advantage of being relatively inexpensive and easy to maintain, and allow for quick screening and collection of samples. However, the wavelength of the light produced is limited by the availability of different anode materials. Furthermore, the intensity is limited by the power applied and cooling capacity available to avoid melting the anode. In such systems, electrons are boiled off of a cathode and accelerated through a strong electric potential of ~50 kV; having reached a high speed, the electrons collide with a metal plate, emitting bremsstrahlung and some strong spectral lines corresponding to the excitation of inner-shell electrons of the metal. The most common metal used is copper, which can be kept cool easily, due to its high thermal conductivity, and which produces strong Kα and Kβ lines. The Kβ line is sometimes suppressed with a thin (~10 µm) nickel foil. The simplest and cheapest variety of sealed X-ray tube has a stationary anode (the Crookes tube) and run with ~2 kW of electron beam power. The more expensive variety has a rotating-anode type source that run with ~14 kW of e-beam power.

X-rays are generally filtered (by use of X-ray filters) to a single wavelength (made monochromatic) and collimated to a single direction before they are allowed to strike the crystal. The filtering not only simplifies the data analysis, but also removes radiation that degrades the crystal without contributing useful information. Collimation is done either with a collimator (basically, a long tube) or with a clever arrangement of gently curved mirrors. Mirror systems are preferred for small crystals (under 0.3 mm) or with large unit cells (over 150 Å).

Rotating anodes were used by Joanna (Joka) Maria Vandenberg in the first experiments that demonstrated the power of X rays for quick (in real time production) screening of large InGaAsP thin film wafers for quality control of quantum well lasers.

Microfocus tube
A more recent development is the microfocus tube, which can deliver at least as high a beam flux (after collimation) as rotating-anode sources but only require a beam power of a few tens or hundreds of watts rather than requiring several kilowatts.

Synchrotron radiation
Synchrotron radiation sources are some of the brightest light sources on earth and are some of the most powerful tools available to X-ray crystallographers. X-ray beams generated in large machines called synchrotrons which accelerate electrically charged particles, often electrons, to nearly the speed of light and confine them in a (roughly) circular loop using magnetic fields.

Synchrotrons are generally national facilities, each with several dedicated beamlines where data is collected without interruption. Synchrotrons were originally designed for use by high-energy physicists studying subatomic particles and cosmic phenomena. The largest component of each synchrotron is its electron storage ring. This ring is actually not a perfect circle, but a many-sided polygon. At each corner of the polygon, or sector, precisely aligned magnets bend the electron stream. As the electrons' path is bent, they emit bursts of energy in the form of X-rays.

Using synchrotron radiation frequently has specific requirements for X-ray crystallography. The intense ionizing radiation can cause radiation damage to samples, particularly macromolecular crystals. Cryo crystallography protects the sample from radiation damage, by freezing the crystal at liquid nitrogen temperatures (~100 K). Cryocrystallography methods are applied to home source rotating anode sources as well.  However, synchrotron radiation frequently has the advantage of user-selectable wavelengths, allowing for anomalous scattering experiments which maximizes anomalous signal. This is critical in experiments such as single wavelength anomalous dispersion (SAD) and multi-wavelength anomalous dispersion (MAD).

Free-electron laser
Free-electron lasers have been developed for use in X-ray crystallography. These are the brightest X-ray sources currently available; with the X-rays coming in femtosecond bursts. The intensity of the source is such that atomic resolution diffraction patterns can be resolved for crystals otherwise too small for collection. However, the intense light source also destroys the sample, requiring multiple crystals to be shot. As each crystal is randomly oriented in the beam, hundreds of thousands of individual diffraction images must be collected in order to get a complete data set. This method, serial femtosecond crystallography, has been used in solving the structure of a number of protein crystal structures, sometimes noting differences with equivalent structures collected from synchrotron sources.

Recording the reflections

When a crystal is mounted and exposed to an intense beam of X-rays, it scatters the X-rays into a pattern of spots or reflections that can be observed on a screen behind the crystal. A similar pattern may be seen by shining a laser pointer at a compact disc. The relative intensities of these spots provide the information to determine the arrangement of molecules within the crystal in atomic detail. The intensities of these reflections may be recorded with photographic film, an area detector (such as a pixel detector) or with a charge-coupled device (CCD) image sensor. The peaks at small angles correspond to low-resolution data, whereas those at high angles represent high-resolution data; thus, an upper limit on the eventual resolution of the structure can be determined from the first few images. Some measures of diffraction quality can be determined at this point, such as the mosaicity of the crystal and its overall disorder, as observed in the peak widths. Some pathologies of the crystal that would render it unfit for solving the structure can also be diagnosed quickly at this point.

One image of spots is insufficient to reconstruct the whole crystal; it represents only a small slice of the full Fourier transform. To collect all the necessary information, the crystal must be rotated step-by-step through 180°, with an image recorded at every step; actually, slightly more than 180° is required to cover reciprocal space, due to the curvature of the Ewald sphere. However, if the crystal has a higher symmetry, a smaller angular range such as 90° or 45° may be recorded. The rotation axis should be changed at least once, to avoid developing a "blind spot" in reciprocal space close to the rotation axis. It is customary to rock the crystal slightly (by 0.5–2°) to catch a broader region of reciprocal space.

Multiple data sets may be necessary for certain phasing methods. For example, multi-wavelength anomalous dispersion phasing requires that the scattering be recorded at least three (and usually four, for redundancy) wavelengths of the incoming X-ray radiation. A single crystal may degrade too much during the collection of one data set, owing to radiation damage; in such cases, data sets on multiple crystals must be taken.

Data analysis

Crystal symmetry, unit cell, and image scaling

The recorded series of two-dimensional diffraction patterns, each corresponding to a different crystal orientation, is converted into a three-dimensional model of the electron density; the conversion uses the mathematical technique of Fourier transforms, which is explained below. Each spot corresponds to a different type of variation in the electron density; the crystallographer must determine which variation corresponds to which spot (indexing), the relative strengths of the spots in different images (merging and scaling) and how the variations should be combined to yield the total electron density (phasing).

Data processing begins with indexing the reflections. This means identifying the dimensions of the unit cell and which image peak corresponds to which position in reciprocal space. A byproduct of indexing is to determine the symmetry of the crystal, i.e., its space group. Some space groups can be eliminated from the beginning. For example, reflection symmetries cannot be observed in chiral molecules; thus, only 65 space groups of 230 possible are allowed for protein molecules which are almost always chiral. Indexing is generally accomplished using an autoindexing routine. Having assigned symmetry, the data is then integrated. This converts the hundreds of images containing the thousands of reflections into a single file, consisting of (at the very least) records of the Miller index of each reflection, and an intensity for each reflection (at this state the file often also includes error estimates and measures of partiality (what part of a given reflection was recorded on that image)).

A full data set may consist of hundreds of separate images taken at different orientations of the crystal. The first step is to merge and scale these various images, that is, to identify which peaks appear in two or more images (merging) and to scale the relative images so that they have a consistent intensity scale. Optimizing the intensity scale is critical because the relative intensity of the peaks is the key information from which the structure is determined. The repetitive technique of crystallographic data collection and the often high symmetry of crystalline materials cause the diffractometer to record many symmetry-equivalent reflections multiple times. This allows calculating the symmetry-related R-factor, a reliability index based upon how similar are the measured intensities of symmetry-equivalent reflections, thus assessing the quality of the data.

Initial phasing

The data collected from a diffraction experiment is a reciprocal space representation of the crystal lattice. The position of each diffraction 'spot' is governed by the size and shape of the unit cell, and the inherent symmetry within the crystal. The intensity of each diffraction 'spot' is recorded, and this intensity is proportional to the square of the structure factor amplitude. The structure factor is a complex number containing information relating to both the amplitude and phase of a wave. In order to obtain an interpretable electron density map, both amplitude and phase must be known (an electron density map allows a crystallographer to build a starting model of the molecule). The phase cannot be directly recorded during a diffraction experiment: this is known as the phase problem. Initial phase estimates can be obtained in a variety of ways:
 Ab initio phasing or direct methods – This is usually the method of choice for small molecules (<1000 non-hydrogen atoms), and has been used successfully to solve the phase problems for small proteins. If the resolution of the data is better than 1.4 Å (140 pm), direct methods can be used to obtain phase information, by exploiting known phase relationships between certain groups of reflections.
 Molecular replacement – if a related structure is known, it can be used as a search model in molecular replacement to determine the orientation and position of the molecules within the unit cell. The phases obtained this way can be used to generate electron density maps.
 Anomalous X-ray scattering (MAD or SAD phasing) – the X-ray wavelength may be scanned past an absorption edge of an atom, which changes the scattering in a known way. By recording full sets of reflections at three different wavelengths (far below, far above and in the middle of the absorption edge) one can solve for the substructure of the anomalously diffracting atoms and hence the structure of the whole molecule. The most popular method of incorporating anomalous scattering atoms into proteins is to express the protein in a methionine auxotroph (a host incapable of synthesizing methionine) in a media rich in seleno-methionine, which contains selenium atoms. A multi-wavelength anomalous dispersion (MAD) experiment can then be conducted around the absorption edge, which should then yield the position of any methionine residues within the protein, providing initial phases.
 Heavy atom methods (multiple isomorphous replacement) – If electron-dense metal atoms can be introduced into the crystal, direct methods or Patterson-space methods can be used to determine their location and to obtain initial phases. Such heavy atoms can be introduced either by soaking the crystal in a heavy atom-containing solution, or by co-crystallization (growing the crystals in the presence of a heavy atom). As in multi-wavelength anomalous dispersion phasing, the changes in the scattering amplitudes can be interpreted to yield the phases. Although this is the original method by which protein crystal structures were solved, it has largely been superseded by multi-wavelength anomalous dispersion phasing with selenomethionine.

Model building and phase refinement

Having obtained initial phases, an initial model can be built. The atomic positions in the model and their respective Debye-Waller factors (or B-factors, accounting for the thermal motion of the atom) can be refined to fit the observed diffraction data, ideally yielding a better set of phases. A new model can then be fit to the new electron density map and successive rounds of refinement is carried out. This iterative process continues until the correlation between the diffraction data and the model is maximized. The agreement is measured by an R-factor defined as

where F is the structure factor. A similar quality criterion is Rfree, which is calculated from a subset (~10%) of reflections that were not included in the structure refinement. Both R factors depend on the resolution of the data. As a rule of thumb, Rfree should be approximately the resolution in angstroms divided by 10; thus, a data-set with 2 Å resolution should yield a final Rfree ~ 0.2. Chemical bonding features such as stereochemistry, hydrogen bonding and distribution of bond lengths and angles are complementary measures of the model quality. Phase bias is a serious problem in such iterative model building. Omit maps are a common technique used to check for this.

It may not be possible to observe every atom in the asymmetric unit. In many cases, Crystallographic disorder smears the electron density map. Weakly scattering atoms such as hydrogen are routinely invisible. It is also possible for a single atom to appear multiple times in an electron density map, e.g., if a protein sidechain has multiple (<4) allowed conformations. In still other cases, the crystallographer may detect that the covalent structure deduced for the molecule was incorrect, or changed. For example, proteins may be cleaved or undergo post-translational modifications that were not detected prior to the crystallization.

Disorder

A common challenge in refinement of crystal structures results from crystallographic disorder.  Disorder can take many forms but in general involves the coexistence of two or more species or conformations.  Failure to recognize disorder results in flawed interpretation.  Pitfalls from improper modeling of disorder are illustrated by the discounted hypothesis of bond stretch isomerism.  Disorder is modelled with respect to the relative population of the components, often only two, and their identity.  In structures of large molecules and ions, solvent and counterions are often disordered.

Applied computational data analysis
The use of computational methods for the powder X-ray diffraction data analysis is now generalized. It typically compares the experimental data to the simulated diffractogram of a model structure, taking into account the instrumental parameters, and refines the structural or microstructural parameters of the model using least squares based minimization algorithm. Most available tools allowing phase identification and structural refinement are based on the Rietveld method, some of them being open and free software such as FullProf Suite, Jana2006, MAUD, Rietan, GSAS, etc. while others are available under commercials licenses such as Diffrac.Suite TOPAS, Match!, etc. Most of these tools also allow Le Bail refinement (also referred to as profile matching), that is, refinement of the cell parameters based on the Bragg peaks positions and peak profiles, without taking into account the crystallographic structure by itself. More recent tools allow the refinement of both structural and microstructural data, such as the FAULTS program included in the FullProf Suite, which allows the refinement of structures with planar defects (e.g. stacking faults, twinnings, intergrowths).

Deposition of the structure
Once the model of a molecule's structure has been finalized, it is often deposited in a crystallographic database such as the Cambridge Structural Database (for small molecules), the Inorganic Crystal Structure Database (ICSD) (for inorganic compounds) or the Protein Data Bank (for protein and sometimes nucleic acids). Many structures obtained in private commercial ventures to crystallize medicinally relevant proteins are not deposited in public crystallographic databases.

Diffraction theory

The main goal of X-ray crystallography is to determine the density of electrons f(r) throughout the crystal, where r represents the three-dimensional position vector within the crystal. To do this, X-ray scattering is used to collect data about its Fourier transform F(q), which is inverted mathematically to obtain the density defined in real space, using the formula
 
where the integral is taken over all values of q. The three-dimensional real vector q represents a point in reciprocal space, that is, to a particular oscillation in the electron density as one moves in the direction in which q points. The length of q corresponds to  divided by the wavelength of the oscillation. The corresponding formula for a Fourier transform will be used below
 
where the integral is summed over all possible values of the position vector r within the crystal.

The Fourier transform F(q) is generally a complex number, and therefore has a magnitude |F(q)| and a phase φ(q) related by the equation
 
The intensities of the reflections observed in X-ray diffraction give us the magnitudes |F(q)| but not the phases φ(q). To obtain the phases, full sets of reflections are collected with known alterations to the scattering, either by modulating the wavelength past a certain absorption edge or by adding strongly scattering (i.e., electron-dense) metal atoms such as mercury. Combining the magnitudes and phases yields the full Fourier transform F(q), which may be inverted to obtain the electron density f(r).

Crystals are often idealized as being perfectly periodic. In that ideal case, the atoms are positioned on a perfect lattice, the electron density is perfectly periodic, and the Fourier transform F(q) is zero except when q belongs to the reciprocal lattice (the so-called Bragg peaks). In reality, however, crystals are not perfectly periodic; atoms vibrate about their mean position, and there may be disorder of various types, such as mosaicity, dislocations, various point defects, and heterogeneity in the conformation of crystallized molecules. Therefore, the Bragg peaks have a finite width and there may be significant diffuse scattering, a continuum of scattered X-rays that fall between the Bragg peaks.

Intuitive understanding by Bragg's law
An intuitive understanding of X-ray diffraction can be obtained from the Bragg model of diffraction. In this model, a given reflection is associated with a set of evenly spaced sheets running through the crystal, usually passing through the centers of the atoms of the crystal lattice. The orientation of a particular set of sheets is identified by its three Miller indices (h, k, l), and let their spacing be noted by d. William Lawrence Bragg proposed a model in which the incoming X-rays are scattered specularly (mirror-like) from each plane; from that assumption, X-rays scattered from adjacent planes will combine constructively (constructive interference) when the angle θ between the plane and the X-ray results in a path-length difference that is an integer multiple n of the X-ray wavelength λ.
 
A reflection is said to be indexed when its Miller indices (or, more correctly, its reciprocal lattice vector components) have been identified from the known wavelength and the scattering angle 2θ. Such indexing gives the unit-cell parameters, the lengths and angles of the unit-cell, as well as its space group. Since Bragg's law does not interpret the relative intensities of the reflections, however, it is generally inadequate to solve for the arrangement of atoms within the unit-cell; for that, a Fourier transform method must be carried out.

Scattering as a Fourier transform
The incoming X-ray beam has a polarization and should be represented as a vector wave; however, for simplicity, let it be represented here as a scalar wave. We also ignore the complication of the time dependence of the wave and just concentrate on the wave's spatial dependence. Plane waves can be represented by a wave vector kin, and so the strength of the incoming wave at time t = 0 is given by
 

At position r within the sample, let there be a density of scatterers f(r); these scatterers should produce a scattered spherical wave of amplitude proportional to the local amplitude of the incoming wave times the number of scatterers in a small volume dV about r
 
where S is the proportionality constant.

Consider the fraction of scattered waves that leave with an outgoing wave-vector of kout and strike the screen at rscreen. Since no energy is lost (elastic, not inelastic scattering), the wavelengths are the same as are the magnitudes of the wave-vectors |kin|=|kout|. From the time that the photon is scattered at r until it is absorbed at rscreen, the photon undergoes a change in phase
 

The net radiation arriving at rscreen is the sum of all the scattered waves throughout the crystal
 
which may be written as a Fourier transform
 
where q = kout – kin. The measured intensity of the reflection will be square of this amplitude

Friedel and Bijvoet mates
For every reflection corresponding to a point q in the reciprocal space, there is another reflection of the same intensity at the opposite point -q. This opposite reflection is known as the Friedel mate of the original reflection. This symmetry results from the mathematical fact that the density of electrons f(r) at a position r is always a real number. As noted above, f(r) is the inverse transform of its Fourier transform F(q); however, such an inverse transform is a complex number in general. To ensure that f(r) is real, the Fourier transform F(q) must be such that the Friedel mates F(−q) and F(q) are complex conjugates of one another. Thus, F(−q) has the same magnitude as F(q) but they have the opposite phase, i.e., φ(q) = −φ(-q)
 

The equality of their magnitudes ensures that the Friedel mates have the same intensity |F|2. This symmetry allows one to measure the full Fourier transform from only half the reciprocal space, e.g., by rotating the crystal slightly more than 180° instead of a full 360° revolution. In crystals with significant symmetry, even more reflections may have the same intensity (Bijvoet mates); in such cases, even less of the reciprocal space may need to be measured.  In favorable cases of high symmetry, sometimes only 90° or even only 45° of data are required to completely explore the reciprocal space.

The Friedel-mate constraint can be derived from the definition of the inverse Fourier transform
 

Since Euler's formula states that eix = cos(x) + i sin(x), the inverse Fourier transform can be separated into a sum of a purely real part and a purely imaginary part
 

The function f(r) is real if and only if the second integral Isin is zero for all values of r. In turn, this is true if and only if the above constraint is satisfied
 
since Isin = −Isin implies that Isin = 0.

Ewald's sphere

Each X-ray diffraction image represents only a slice, a spherical slice of reciprocal space, as may be seen by the Ewald sphere construction. Both kout and kin have the same length, due to the elastic scattering, since the wavelength has not changed. Therefore, they may be represented as two radial vectors in a sphere in reciprocal space, which shows the values of q that are sampled in a given diffraction image. Since there is a slight spread in the incoming wavelengths of the incoming X-ray beam, the values of|F(q)|can be measured only for q vectors located between the two spheres corresponding to those radii. Therefore, to obtain a full set of Fourier transform data, it is necessary to rotate the crystal through slightly more than 180°, or sometimes less if sufficient symmetry is present. A full 360° rotation is not needed because of a symmetry intrinsic to the Fourier transforms of real functions (such as the electron density), but "slightly more" than 180° is needed to cover all of reciprocal space within a given resolution because of the curvature of the Ewald sphere. In practice, the crystal is rocked by a small amount (0.25–1°) to incorporate reflections near the boundaries of the spherical Ewald's shells.

Patterson function

A well-known result of Fourier transforms is the autocorrelation theorem, which states that the autocorrelation c(r) of a function f(r)
 
has a Fourier transform C(q) that is the squared magnitude of F(q)

Therefore, the autocorrelation function c(r) of the electron density (also known as the Patterson function) can be computed directly from the reflection intensities, without computing the phases. In principle, this could be used to determine the crystal structure directly; however, it is difficult to realize in practice. The autocorrelation function corresponds to the distribution of vectors between atoms in the crystal; thus, a crystal of N atoms in its unit cell may have N(N − 1) peaks in its Patterson function. Given the inevitable errors in measuring the intensities, and the mathematical difficulties of reconstructing atomic positions from the interatomic vectors, this technique is rarely used to solve structures, except for the simplest crystals.

Advantages of a crystal
In principle, an atomic structure could be determined from applying X-ray scattering to non-crystalline samples, even to a single molecule. However, crystals offer a much stronger signal due to their periodicity. A crystalline sample is by definition periodic; a crystal is composed of many unit cells repeated indefinitely in three independent directions. Such periodic systems have a Fourier transform that is concentrated at periodically repeating points in reciprocal space known as Bragg peaks; the Bragg peaks correspond to the reflection spots observed in the diffraction image. Since the amplitude at these reflections grows linearly with the number N of scatterers, the observed intensity of these spots should grow quadratically, like N2. In other words, using a crystal concentrates the weak scattering of the individual unit cells into a much more powerful, coherent reflection that can be observed above the noise. This is an example of constructive interference.

In a liquid, powder or amorphous sample, molecules within that sample are in random orientations. Such samples have a continuous Fourier spectrum that uniformly spreads its amplitude thereby reducing the measured signal intensity, as is observed in SAXS. More importantly, the orientational information is lost. Although theoretically possible, it is experimentally difficult to obtain atomic-resolution structures of complicated, asymmetric molecules from such rotationally averaged data. An intermediate case is fiber diffraction in which the subunits are arranged periodically in at least one dimension.

Nobel Prizes involving X-ray crystallography

Applications 
X-ray diffraction has wide and various applications in the chemical, biochemical, physical, material and mineralogical sciences. Laue claimed in 1937 that the technique "has extended the power of observing minute structure ten thousand times beyond that given us by the microscope". X-ray diffraction is analogous to a microscope with atomic-level resolution which shows the atoms and their electron distribution.

X-ray diffraction, electron diffraction, and neutron diffraction give information about the structure of matter, crystalline and non-crystalline, at the atomic and molecular level. In addition, these methods may be applied in the study of properties of all materials, inorganic, organic or biological. Due to the importance and variety of applications of diffraction studies of crystals, many Nobel Prizes have been awarded for such studies.

Drug identification 
X-ray diffraction has been used for the identification of antibiotic drugs such as: eight β-lactam (ampicillin sodium, penicillin G procaine, cefalexin, ampicillin trihydrate, benzathine penicillin, benzylpenicillin sodium, cefotaxime sodium, Ceftriaxone sodium), three tetracycline (doxycycline hydrochloride, oxytetracycline dehydrate, tetracycline hydrochloride) and two macrolide (azithromycin, erythromycin estolate) antibiotic drugs. Each of these drugs has a unique X-Ray Diffraction (XRD) pattern that makes their identification possible.

Characterization of nanomaterials, textile fibers and polymers 
Forensic examination of any trace evidence is based upon Locard's exchange principle. This states that "every contact leaves a trace". In practice, even though a transfer of material has taken place, it may be impossible to detect, because the amount transferred is very small.

XRD has proven its role in the advancement of nanomaterial research. It is one of the primary characterization tools and provides information about the structural properties of various nanomaterials in both powder and thin-film form.

Textile fibers are a mixture of crystalline and amorphous substances. Therefore, the measurement of the degree of crystalline gives useful data in the characterization of fibers using X-ray diffractometry. It has been reported that X-ray diffraction was used to identify of a "crystalline" deposit which was found on a chair. The deposit was found to be amorphous, but the diffraction pattern present matched that of polymethylmethacrylate. Pyrolysis mass spectrometry later identified the deposit as polymethylcyanoacrylaon of Boin crystal parameters.

Integrated circuits
X-ray diffraction has been demonstrated as a method for investigating the complex structure of integrated circuits.

See also 

 Beevers–Lipson strip
 Bragg diffraction
 Crystallographic database
 Crystallographic point groups
 Difference density map
 Electron diffraction
 Energy Dispersive X-Ray Diffraction
 Flack parameter
 Henderson limit
 International Year of Crystallography
 John Desmond Bernal
 Multipole density formalism
 Neutron diffraction
 Powder diffraction
 Ptychography
 Scherrer equation
 Small angle X-ray scattering (SAXS)
 Structure determination
 Ultrafast x-ray
 Wide angle X-ray scattering (WAXS)

References

Further reading

International Tables for Crystallography

Bound collections of articles

Textbooks

 
 
 
 
 
 
 
 
 
 
 
 
 
 , PDF copy of select chapters

Applied computational data analysis

Historical

External links

Tutorials
 Learning Crystallography
 Simple, non technical introduction
The Crystallography Collection, video series from the Royal Institution 
 "Small Molecule Crystalization" (PDF) at Illinois Institute of Technology website
 International Union of Crystallography
 Crystallography 101
 Interactive structure factor tutorial, demonstrating properties of the diffraction pattern of a 2D crystal.
 Picturebook of Fourier Transforms, illustrating the relationship between crystal and diffraction pattern in 2D.
 Lecture notes on X-ray crystallography and structure determination
 Online lecture on Modern X-ray Scattering Methods for Nanoscale Materials Analysis by Richard J. Matyi
Interactive Crystallography Timeline  from the Royal Institution

Primary databases
 Crystallography Open Database (COD)
 Protein Data Bank (PDB)
 Nucleic Acid Databank (NDB)
 Cambridge Structural Database (CSD)
 Inorganic Crystal Structure Database (ICSD)
 Biological Macromolecule Crystallization Database (BMCD)

Derivative databases
 PDBsum
 Proteopedia – the collaborative, 3D encyclopedia of proteins and other molecules
 RNABase
 HIC-Up database of PDB ligands 
 Structural Classification of Proteins database
 CATH Protein Structure Classification
 List of transmembrane proteins with known 3D structure 
 Orientations of Proteins in Membranes database

Structural validation
 MolProbity structural validation suite
 ProSA-web
 NQ-Flipper (check for unfavorable rotamers of Asn and Gln residues)
 DALI server (identifies proteins similar to a given protein)

 
Laboratory techniques in condensed matter physics
Crystallography
Diffraction
Materials science
Protein structure
Protein methods
Protein imaging
Synchrotron-related techniques
Articles containing video clips
Crystallography